Kuolema (Finnish for "death") is the second studio album by the Finnish dark metal band Ajattara. It was released in 2003 on Spikefarm Records.

Track listing

Personnel
 Ruoja - vocals, guitars, keyboards
 Atoni - bass
 Malakias I - drums

Additional personnel and staff
 Niklas Sundin - cover art
 Mika Jussila - mastering
 Tuomo Valtonen - producer
 Mika Vuoto - photography
 Judas Möilanen - layout

External links
 Kuolema at Allmusic

2003 albums
Ajattara albums